Reverse speech is a pseudoscientific topic first advocated by David John Oates which gained publicity when it was mentioned on Art Bell's nightly Coast to Coast AM radio talk show. It is based upon the theory that during spoken language production, human speakers subconsciously produce hidden messages that give insights into their innermost thoughts. Oates claims that it therefore has applications in psychotherapy, criminology and business negotiation. The theory has been rejected by mainstream science and academia.

Claims

Oates' claim is that, on average, once in every 15–20 seconds of casual conversation a person produces two related sentences—a "forward-spoken" message that is heard consciously, and a "backwards" message unconsciously embedded in the person's speech. These two modes of speech, forward and backward, are supposedly dependent upon each other and form an integral part of human communication. In the dynamics of interpersonal communication, both modes of speech combine to communicate the total psyche of the person, conscious as well as unconscious. Oates claims that backward speech is always honest and reveals the truth about the speaker's intentions and motivations.  The most famous recording that allegedly demonstrates this is the speech given by Neil Armstrong at the time of the first human lunar landing on 20 July 1969. If played backwards, the words "small step for man" sound somewhat like "Man will spacewalk."

An alternative explanation for this phenomenon is pareidolia, the tendency of the human brain to perceive meaningful patterns in random noise. Pareidolia is even more likely to occur when a person consciously tries to detect a pattern, as is the case for someone listening for intelligible phrases in backwards speech. The power of suggestion is then used to nudge the listener to hear what the presenter wants him to hear. David John Oates, for example, almost always tells the listener in advance what he should expect to hear, thereby planting a suggestion that would make the listener more likely to actually "hear" that phrase. A study has shown that when listening to the same clips without being told in advance what to expect, the results have a higher variation.

Rejection by the scientific community
Most academics in the field of linguistics have not paid attention to Oates' work, and it has been called a pseudoscience.  For the most part, universities and research institutes have refused to test Oates' theories because of a lack of theoretical basis to make his predictions even worth testing, and the fact that many of his claims are untestable, but one of the few scientific experiments to evaluate Oates' claims did not support his findings.  Others have criticized "reverse speech" as lacking a rigorous methodology and not being informed by an understanding of issues in linguistics, and characterized Oates as "more interested in making a profit than educating others," pointing out the large amount of merchandise and services his website sells.  Reverse speech has been compared to the controversial field (labelled a pseudoscience by some) of neuro-linguistic programming.  Because of the "dogmatic" tone of Oates' material, reverse speech has been compared to "fringe literature."

Oates' own claims about the applications of reverse speech have also been challenged.  One report has questioned whether reverse speech was ever really used in police work, as Oates claimed.  Likewise, his claim that reverse speech has applications in psychology and psychotherapy is not supported by mainstream research in those fields. Oates' work has been described as "dangerous" because of its potential for misuse and the likelihood of leading to false accusations of people in criminal courts, similarly to the controversial practice of facilitated communication.

References

Perception
Human voice
Pseudoscience
Pseudolinguistics